Masistylum is a genus of flies in the family Tachinidae.

Species
M. arcuatum (Mik, 1863)
M. stenommatum Wood, 1974

References

Exoristinae
Diptera of Europe
Diptera of North America
Tachinidae genera
Taxa named by Friedrich Moritz Brauer
Taxa named by Julius von Bergenstamm